Egon Schidan (16 September 1930 – 7 August 2002) was a German boxer. He competed in the men's bantamweight event at the 1952 Summer Olympics.

References

1930 births
2002 deaths
German male boxers
Olympic boxers of Germany
Boxers at the 1952 Summer Olympics
Place of birth missing
Bantamweight boxers